Coyote is a Canadian drama film, directed by Katherine Jerkovic and released in 2022. The film stars Jorge Martinez Colorado as Camilo, a Mexican immigrant to Canada who is rebuilding his life as a chef in La Malbaie, Quebec, who finds his plan complicated when his adult daughter Tania (Eva Avila) shows up needing his help to care for her son (Enzo Desmeules) while she enters recovery for her drug addiction problems.

The film entered production in fall 2021.

The film premiered in the Contemporary World Cinema stream at the 2022 Toronto International Film Festival on September 11, 2022. It later screened in the Borsos Competition at the 2022 Whistler Film Festival, where it won the awards for Best Borsos Competition Film and Best Performance in a Borsos Competition Film (Martinez Colorado).

References

External links

2022 films
2022 drama films
Canadian drama films
Films shot in Quebec
Films set in Quebec
Films directed by Katherine Jerkovic
Spanish-language Canadian films
2020s Canadian films